Yum Jung-ah (born July 28, 1972) is a South Korean actress. Her notable films include A Tale of Two Sisters (2003), The Big Swindle (2004), The Old Garden (2007), and Cart (2014), as well as the television series Royal Family (2011), and Sky Castle (2018). She was the first runner-up at Miss Korea 1991 and represented Korea in Miss International 1992 and finished as the second runner-up.

Personal life 
Yum Jung-ah married  doctor  Heo Il on December 30, 2006. They have 2 children.

Filmography

Film

Television series

Variety show

Music video

Musical theatre

Awards and nominations

References

External links 
 
 
 

20th-century South Korean actresses
21st-century South Korean actresses
South Korean film actresses
South Korean television actresses
South Korean musical theatre actresses
1972 births
Living people
Miss Korea delegates
Miss International 1992 delegates
Chung-Ang University alumni
Best Actress Paeksang Arts Award (film) winners
Best Actress Paeksang Arts Award (television) winners